Marinobacter koreensis is a Gram-negative, straight-rod-shaped, aerobic and moderately halophilic bacterium from the genus of Marinobacter which has been isolated from sea sand from Pohang in Korea.

References

Further reading

External links
Type strain of Marinobacter koreensis at BacDive -  the Bacterial Diversity Metadatabase

Alteromonadales
Bacteria described in 2006
Halophiles